WT1 is an oncogene associated with Wilms' tumor nephroblastoma cancer.

WT1 or WT-1 may also refer to:

 WT1-AS (WIT1), the WT1 antisense RNA
 Wacyk-Tyrala WT-1, a prototype Polish sport airplane designed by Stanisław Wacyk and Tadeuz Tyrala

See also

 WT (disambiguation)
 WTI (disambiguation)
 WTL (disambiguation)